Memo Remigi (born Emidio Remigi, 27 May 1938) is an Italian singer-songwriter, composer and television personality.

Born in Erba, Como, during his studies Remigi played piano in various groups. He debuted as a singer in 1963 winning the Liegi Song Festival with the song "Oui, je sais". Returned to Italy, Remigi obtained an immediate success with the song "Innamorati a Milano", which entered the Disco per l'estate competition in 1965, then he alternated the activities of singer and of composer, composing songs for, among others, Ornella Vanoni and Iva Zanicchi. He also hosted several RAI television programs. He considers himself Roman Catholic.

References

External links

 

1938 births
People from the Province of Milan
Italian singer-songwriters
Italian pop singers
Living people
Italian composers
Italian male composers
Italian television personalities
Italian Roman Catholics